Mynydd Tal-y-Mignedd is a peak on the Nantlle Ridge in Snowdonia, north Wales. It is located at the centre of the ridge, and is a subsidiary summit of Trum y Ddysgl.

The summit is crowned by a large stone obelisk, put up to commemorate Queen Victoria's Diamond Jubilee. A fine arete links it to its parent, Trum y Ddysgl, while a col links it to the next summit eastwards along the ridge, Craig Cwm Silyn.

References

Dolbenmaen
Llanllyfni
Mountains and hills of Gwynedd
Mountains and hills of Snowdonia
Hewitts of Wales
Nuttalls